From Chao Phraya to Irrawaddy is a 2022 Thai-Burmese historical drama television series directed by Chatchai Katenut starring Thai actor Jirayu Thantrakul, Thai actress Tangtang Nattaruchi, Burmese actor Daung and Burmese actress Hnin Thway Yu Aung. It aired on Thai PBS 3, from January 1 to February 6, 2022, on every Saturday and Sunday at (THA) 20:15.

The series is based on the Burmese-Thai historical background of Konbaung dynasty and post-Ayutthaya Kingdom . That was eighteen years after dissolution of Ayutthaya Kingdom, during the time of King Bodawpaya.

Synopsis
Nutchanat (Tangtang Nattaruchi) got a job as an assistant chef at a prestigious hotel in downtown Yangon and met her new friend, Zin Zin (Hnin Thway Yu Aung) and the Executive Chef, Pakorn (Jirayu Thantrakul). One day, Nutchanat got a book Enaung (the Panji tales in Burmese) from old bookshop and she dances like the one in the book, then she dreamed that she was in the Ava Palace over two hundred years in Burma, she met Princess Kunthon and Princess Mongkut, two princesses who were forcibly taken from Ayutthaya. She said her name was "Pin." Maung Sa (Daung), a leading artist in Burmese royal drama, took her for a dance.

Cast
 as Pakorn / Bagong
Tangtang Nutrugee Wisawanart as Nutchanat / Pin
Daung as Maung Sa
Hnin Thway Yu Aung as Zin Zin / Consort Mala, Consort of King Bodawpaya
 as Shwedaung Min
Penpak Sirikul as Princess Kunthon
Duangjai Hirunsri as Princess Mongkut
Kowit Wattanakul as U Htay Shwe / King Bodawpaya
Sumontha Suanpholaat as Chut

Episodes

Notes

References

2022 Thai television series debuts
Thai PBS original programming
Burmese television series
Thai historical television series